Burmanniaceae is a family of flowering plants, consisting of 99 species of herbaceous plants in eight genera.

Description
These plants are annual or perennial herbs, with generally unbranched stems, some lacking leaves. Some members of this family lack chlorophyll and are mycotrophic (also called myco-heterotrophic).

The family tends to be saprophytic and even the autotrophic species are all endomycorrhizal and probably at least hemisaprophytic.

The family occurs worldwide, with a mostly tropic to subtropical distribution. A number of species are threatened.

Taxonomy
John Lindley described the family as Burmanniae, with the single genus Burmannia, in 1830. In 1998 the APG I system placed Burmanniaceae as one of five families in the order Dioscoreales, within the monocot clade. The APG II system of 2003, as a result of an extensive study by Caddick and colleagues (2002), using an analysis of three genes, rbcL, atpB and 18S rDNA, in addition to morphological criteria, led to a considerable rearrangement of the families within Dioscoreales. In APG II the circumscription of the family was wider and included the plants that belonged to the family Thismiaceae in APG I. The result was an order with only three families. APG III (2009) left this arrangement unchanged.

Nevertheless, some ongoing research has challenged this relationship claiming that the older classification better reflects the evolutionary relationships between the genera. According to these researchers the constituent clades are as follows:

Burmanniaceae sensu stricto
Apteria
Burmannia
Campylosiphon
Cymbocarpa
Dictyostega
Gymnosiphon
Hexapterella
Marthella
Mierisella

Afrothismia clade
Afrothismia

Tribe Thismieae 
 Haplothismia
 Oxygyne
 Thismia
 Tiputinia

But because of conflicting evidence, the APG IV (2016) authors felt it was still premature to propose a restructuring of the order since the most recent evidence upholds the APG configuration and the work of Caddick and colleagues.

Evolution
According to molecular analyses, the myco-heterotrophic type of life that these species lead evolved six (or even more) times independently in the three clades that are part of Burmanniaceae. Afrothismia and tribe Thismieae represent two of these shifts to myco-heterotrophy from autotrophy while Burmanniaceae sensu stricto are the clade where the other four took place. The family appears in the Late Cretaceous but the further diversification and shifts to the typical habit occurred later in the same period and continued after the K-T boundary in Paleogene.

References

Bibliography

 
 
 
 
 
 
 
 
 , In

APG

External links
 
 
 Burmanniaceae, Thismiaceae in L. Watson and M.J. Dallwitz (1992 onwards). The families of flowering plants: descriptions, illustrations, identification, information retrieval. Version: 9 March 2006. https://web.archive.org/web/20070103200438/http://delta-intkey.com/
 Monocot families (USDA)
 Burmanniaceae in the Flora of North America
 Burmanniaceae.org, a site dedicated to the research on this family
 the specialists at work
 NCBI Taxonomy Browser
 links and more  links at CSDL, Texas

 
Monocot families
Santonian first appearances
Extant Santonian first appearances